The Colegio de San Gregorio is an Isabelline style building located in the city of Valladolid, in Castile and León, Spain, it was formerly a college and now is housing the Museo Nacional de Escultura museum. This building is one of the best examples of the architectural style known as Isabelline, which is the characteristic architectural style of the Crown of Castile region during the Catholic Monarchs' reign (late-15th century to early-16th century).

Among other sections highlights its courtyard and its facade for its refined decoration, elegant proportions and the number of symbologies. It was founded as a teaching institution. Aimed at College of Theology for Dominican friars, it has acquired a doctrinal authority and acted as a spiritual and political hotbed in the Central region of Spain's Renaissance and Baroque periods.

History 
The University of Valladolid was founded in the 13th-century during the Alfonso X of Castile the Wise's reign; as in other countries, the emergence of college centers was potentiated, then belatedly was created the Colegio de San Gregorio, who performed in parallel or complementarily in relation to university life. In Valladolid the Colegio Mayor Santa Cruz was also created also in late 15th-century.

The creation of the college, under the title of the Doctor of the Church Saint Gregory the Great, was work of Dominican Alonso de Burgos, the Catholic Monarchs's confessor and Bishop of the dioceses of Córdoba, Cuenca and Palencia. The foundation of the college was confirmed by with papal bull of Pope Innocent VIII in 1487, and accepted as Royal patronage by Queen Isabella the Catholic in 1500, after the founder's death.

It attached to the Convento de San Pablo, which Friar Alonso had been its prior, its foundation was subject to the assignment of the Capilla del Crucifijo (Crucifix's chapel), attached to the Epistle's arm of the Dominican church, to become his own funeral chapel, which later acquired dual function to also serve as a chapel for college.

Work began in 1488 in a process from the inside to outside, being the main facade the last in lift. The Royal shields in the corners of the Large courtyard still do not present the Granada's symbol suggests that this part would be completed before 1492. The building is assumed to completed in 1496.

Unfortunately, very little documentation has been localized on its construction, without knowing conclusively who were their creators. It seems that were incorporated the most famous stonemasons and carvers who at that time were working in Castile, making the set conform as a paradigmatic example of the various trends of Castilian stonework in late-15th century, with Juan Guas and Juan de Talavera responsible for traces and construction of the Friar Alonso's funerary chapel, Simón de Colonia for its main altar, the founder's sepulcher, later replaced by another commissioned to Felipe Bigarny, without being known the causes, and other works at the college, or Gil de Siloé and Diego de la Cruz as commissioners for the chapel's altarpiece.

In 1524 the building was expanded with the addition of a wing to the west as traces of Gaspar de Solórzano, the so-called Edificio de las Azoteas, jutting out from the rest because it had four floors high. There remains of this building's section.

Since its founding, the college became a focus of influence of the Early-Modern Age, in which were formed theologians, men of letters, universities's founders, bishops, king's advisers or jurists, like Bartolomé de las Casas, Melchor Cano, Luis de Granada or Francisco de Vitoria, and in which took place in 1550–1551, for example, the famous Valladolid debate, in which Friar Bartolomé de las Casas defended the indigenous peoples of the America's rights, against Juan Ginés de Sepúlveda supporter of the rights for the dominion of the conquerors towards the Indigenous, whom he considered inferior beings.

In 1577 due to the beneficence of Spaniard Juan Solano, O.P., former bishop of Cusco, Peru, the College of San Gregorio served as a model for the transformation of the Dominican studium at Santa Maria sopra Minerva in Rome into the College of St. Thomas, forerunner of the Pontifical University of Saint Thomas Aquinas, Angelicum.

But with the 18th-century and the arrival of the Enlightenment, the opposition to the ruling Bourbon dynasty exercised by the colleges as debilitating elements of the absolutism implanted, San Gregorio was losing its influence.

It arrived 19th-century, during the Napoleonic French invasion it was used as a barracks, with the suppression of the Regular orders of 1820 it was abandoned, although in the Absolutist Restoration of 1823 was reoccupied, was for a very short period and again abandoned. Finally, the confiscation and expropriation gave way to its use as a prison, a dependencies for the Civil Government, National Institute, the Normal Schools of Teachers, etc.

In 1884 it was declared a National Monument, as also in the following years lost some of the roofs and disappeared the Metaphysics classroom and the corridor attached to the (from internal) facade leading to the chapel.

Description
The structure of the Colegio de San Gregorio is today classified into seven elements: Portada monumental (main facade), Visitor reception area, Chapel, Patio de los Estudios (Courtyard of the studies), Patio Grande (Large courtyard), Monumental staircase, and ruins of the Edificio de las Azoteas (Building of the roofs).

Its architecture, which include, above all, the facade and the courtyard, is considered as one of the best examples of Isabelline art developed in Crown of Castile region during the Catholic Monarchs's reign, which begin to shows strongly the new ideas that came with the beginning of the Early-Modern Age.

Facade

The facade, plain facing and topped with a crest, stands out above all for its spectacular main facade, which by its stylistic features it sets regarding the workshop of Gil de Siloé, a Flemish origin artist, who was at that time in Burgos dealing with the royal sepulchers of the Miraflores Charterhouse and is known to have been commissioned to make the defunct altarpiece of the chapel, very in connection with which the sculptor had made in the Conception's chapel or of Bishop Acuña in the Cathedral of Burgos and has obvious similarities to the upper of the main facade of San Gregorio.

Perhaps evoking the triumphal arches of the architectures at that time were developing in Central Europe, or perhaps the Islamic Madrasas, architects of this building applying an individually decorated of the Castilian late-Gothic (Isabelline), it has a complex symbolic significance in that mix contemporary figures, saints, allegories, wild men, abundant symbolic of power, etc.

It has two bodies framed by two buttresses. The lower hosts a vain lintel decorated with fleur-de-lys, the founder's symbol repeated often enough, covered with three-centered arch in turn covered by another ogee trefoil.

It draw attention to the "savage men" of the jambs and buttresses, a total of sixteen. Theories about the significance of these figures, present in many buildings of 15th-century, are varied and should be put in relation to the context in which these appear. One of its functions would be simple heraldry sculptures. It is also said that, dressed with shield and mace, were the guardians of the building, beastmen guaranteeing security. Or these could allude to the custom of disguising the squires and lackeys in Court (nobility) festivities in which it presented the "savage" as inferior, in relation, for example, the chivalric romances, which mentions hair covered wild men, degraded men, estranged from the civilized world, not Christianized, and could here be in visual confrontation with the knights who also appear on the main facade, with armor, spears and shields, that would be interpreted as allegories of Virtue. On the contrary, these could also be a positive allusion, the mythical image of man in nature, unpolluted, symbol of purity that evokes the time in a perfect and happy world, with prototype to John the Baptist.

Those on the lower part, flanking the main facade, are completely covered with long hair, carrying weapons and the shields are decorated with demonic figures except in one, which has a Knight order of Calatrava's cross, the same motifs of the soldiers' shields of the second floor, the same iconography already seen for over a century.

However, in the top of the main facade are completely different, with the same attributes but without hair on the body and even two hairless, with a more human aspect, and there are authors who consider the oldest representation in Castile of an American Native, reflecting the effect of the Americas's arrival in the European imagination.

The tympanum, on a lintel, seems to represent the offering of the college by Friar Alonso de Burgos to Saint Gregory the Great in the presence of Saints Dominic and Paul, patrons of the neighboring Dominican convent, a somewhat disconcerting scene, unbalanced, with disproportion between the figures and Saint Paul with a cruciferous nimbus, an exclusive attribute of Christ. It seems to be earlier work than the rest, or even reused from other site.

The upper body is divided into three sections, with the center occupied by a hexagonal pylon which starts a pomegranate tree, referring to the Nasrid Kingdom of Granada's conquest in 1492, swirling around putti playing and jumping. It could be a Fountain of Eternal Youth's representation, hence the children, of the Tree of Knowledge, in relation to the building dedicated to the study, an allegory of the Paradise, the place to which men aspire to reach through the knowledge, an allegory of the Golden Age, in relation to the historical moment that was occurring to the Spanish monarchy.

The pomegranate tree is topped by a big shield of the Catholic Monarchs with the St. John's eagle held by two attitude lions and below the Catholic Monarchs's symbols also appear: the beam and arrows. And the use of the royal heraldry with propaganda purposes in this period reached prominence hitherto unknown, present not only in buildings directly promoted by the Catholic Monarchs but also in many that of their closest collaborators, in that way showing participation and acceptance in the political project undertaken by Isabella I and Ferdinand II in relation to the establishment of a modern state with which to control and organize all their territories under their unique power.

Upper body's side sections have the founder's heraldic decoration and two kings of arms placed at height of the central shield.

Distributed among the distributed arboured throughout the main facade are seen multiple scenes related to the defects to be overcome with the study, in relation to the search for truth and rejection of heresy, the triumph of intelligence over force or the strength to overcome temptation.

Patio de los Estudios
The college is organized around two courtyards. The so-called Patio de los Estudios (Courtyard of Studies) is the direct access from main facade, which in the form of Roman atrium shows quadrangular with lobbed section pillars topped with the founder's shields. Originally, this area housed the classrooms of Physics and Metaphysics, which the latter ruined in 20th-century.

From it access, from the left to the Friar Alonso's Chapel and right to the Patio Grande (Large courtyard).

Chapel

The funerary chapel of Friar Alonso at first had access both from the college and from the crossing's portal of the Epistle of Iglesia de San Pablo, today blinded. It was started in 1484 by Juan Guas and Juan de Talavera, being completed in 1490 after many incidents, as its makers were fined for be considered defective their factory. Has rectangular plant with two sections with polygonal apse, covered with starred rib vault with nerves on corbels with the founder's arms with angels at its sides and choir on the feet with a small tribune for the organ. It formerly had a rich iron balustrade fence which was replaced by a neo-Gothic parapet in the 1880s.

In 1499 Simón de Colonia was commissioned to build the sacristy at the foot, and the corridor connecting with the college, the corridor is now disappeared.

Now it can still see several sepulchers that stands. However, during the Napoleonic French invasion, the invasors disappeared all the furnishings, including the Friar Alonso de Burgos's sepulcher by Felipe Bigarny that occupied the center, and the altarpiece by Gil de Siloé.

Patio Grande

The Patio Grande (Large courtyard) was the access to the most important stays of the set. It considered a Hispanic-Flemish (Isabelline) gem, is set in relation to Juan Guas for its similarities to Palacio del Infantado in Guadalajara, although have also located abundant motifs that Bartolomé Solórzano, an active artist at that time in the area, used in the Cathedral of Palencia, seat of the Friar Alonso's bishopric.

It is square with two floors, the lower with slender pillars, perhaps a Solomonic reference in relation to a building as a "temple of wisdom", with capitals of average balls and fleur-de-lis sustaining segmental arches, and the upper with one of the most decorative Isabelline galleries, with parapets openwork with Gothic tracery and geminare arches riddled with garlands and foliage among those appears children playing and where already shown Renassaince influence, of midpoint and a form that goes be more flat.

Then follows a frieze of yokes and arrows on highlighting the imaginative gargoyles.

It has abundant emblems of the Catholic Monarchs and the kingdoms of Navarre and Granada, incorporated into the Crown of Castile during the erection of the building.

Monumental staircase
The only staircase that connects both floors is rectangular of two sections, Isabelline base, decorated walls with padding of Renaissance influence with the founder's heraldry; an impressive Mudéjar roof on a frieze with the Catholic Monarchs's initials; and neo-Gothic parapets with same trace that the base, added in works in the 1860s to replace the wooden fence that had.

Library

On the southeast gallery of the ground floor, which runs along the facade, the kitchen and the refectory were located, and in the upper was the library. Some elements remains in the library site.

Chapter house
On the northwest gallery of the upper floor was located the chapter house. Today remains several Isabelline and Mudéjar elements from this section. Today houses the 'Hall 20' of the museum.

In the stays around the Patio Grande and in the rooms attached to the Edificio de las Azoteas all the museum's collections are distributed.

See also
 Museo Nacional de Escultura
 Isabelline style

Notes

Bibliography
Agapito y Revilla, J., The Church of the Convent of San Pablo and the Colegio de San Gregorio, Valladolid, 1911.
Nieto, F. and Sobejano, E., "The Museo Nacional Colegio de San Gregorio (Valladolid)”. Museos.es: Journal of the General Sub-Office of State Museums, nº 4, 2008, pp. 56–63.
Pereda Espeso, F., "Dwelling of the wild men: The jungle facade of the Colegio de San Gregorio and its contexts". In ALONSO RUIZ, B. (Coord.) The last architects of the Gothic, 2010, pp. 149–218.
Rosende Vadés, A. A., "The issue of "wild men" in the Mondoñedo and Xunqueira de Ambia's stalls". Bulletin of the Seminar of Studies of Art and Archaeology, BSAA, vol 53, 1986, pp. 283–296.
Ruiz Souza, J., "Castile and the freedom of the arts in 15th-century. The acceptance of the heritage of Al-Andalus: from material reality to the theoretical foundations". Anales de Historia del Arte, 2012, vol. 22, special number, pp. 123–161.
Olivares Martínez, Diana. El Colegio de San Gregorio de Valladolid. Madrid: CSIC, 2020.

Universities and colleges in Valladolid
Museums in Valladolid
Isabelline architecture
1487 establishments in Spain
Buildings and structures completed in 1496
Gothic architecture in Castile and León
Mudéjar architecture in Castile and León
Art museums and galleries in Spain
Defunct schools in Spain
Defunct prisons in Spain
Bien de Interés Cultural landmarks in the Province of Valladolid